29 Martello towers and battery installations were constructed or partially constructed in the Greater Dublin Area between 1803 and 1808. The towers were intended to act as a deterrent against a foreign invasion by Napoleon and his French Armies as well as being used as general lookout posts. In later years, towers were also used as coast guard stations, lookout stations to prevent smuggling and as other general purpose military installations by various British and Irish defence forces.

The Killiney bay towers were specifically planned following a 1797 survey by a Major La Chaussée who was employed by the British administration to survey the area and plot out points of weakness and potential locations for military defensive installations.

See also

 List of coastal fortifications of County Cork

Sources 
 Bolton, J., Carey, T., Goodbody, R. & Clabby, G. (2012) The Martello Towers of Dublin. (Dublin: Dún Laoghaire-Rathdown & Fingal County Council).
 Clements, William H. (1998) Towers of Strength: Story of Martello Towers. (London: Pen & Sword). .
 MacKay, Art (2016) Blockhouses & Martello Towers

References 

Martello towers
Coastal fortifications
Round towers
Buildings listed on the Fingal Record of Protected Structures